Jeremiah Keith Pharms (born June 24, 1978) is a former American football fullback/linebacker in the Arena Football League. He was drafted by the Cleveland Browns in the fifth round of the 2001 NFL Draft. He played two seasons for the New York Dragons (2006–2007).

References

External links
Washington Huskies profile

1978 births
Living people
American football fullbacks
American football linebackers
Washington Huskies football players
New York Dragons players
Players of American football from Sacramento, California